Christen Schmidt (22 February 1727 – 6 October 1804) was a Norwegian bishop.

He was born in Kongsvinger as a son of vicar Hans Jacob Schmidt and Alethe S. Lemmich. He enrolled as a student in 1745 and graduated with the cand.theol. degree in May 1748. After some years as a private tutor and a priest at sea, he was appointed as vicar of Nebbelunde, Denmark in July 1759. In September 1769 he became vicar of Asminderød and Fredensborg Palace. He became connected to the Danish Royal Court in July 1772, having been opposed to Johan Friedrich Struensee's rule. In December 1773 he became Bishop of the Diocese of Oslo. Here he was known to be orthodox. He supported the death penalty in 1777.

He was married twice. First to his cousin Petronelle Lemmich, from June 1759 to her death in September 1798. They had the son Frederik Schmidt, a constitutional founding father. His second marriage was to merchant's daughter Ingeborg Catharina Birkenbusch (1778–1856), from November 1803 to his own death.

References

1835 births
1889 deaths
University of Copenhagen alumni
Bishops of Oslo
18th-century Lutheran bishops
19th-century Lutheran bishops
People from Kongsvinger